Niels Marnegrave (born 9 December 1987) is a Belgian retired basketball player and current coach. He currently is an assistant coach for Limburg United of the BNXT League. In his playing career, he played as point guard.

Career
Marnegrave debuted on the professional level in the 2004–05 season for Liège Basket.

After his debut season he signed with Dexia Mons-Hainaut. In 2006 he won the Belgian Cup with the team.

In the 2009–10 season Marnegrave played for RBC Verviers-Pepinster.

He signed a 3-year contract with the Leuven Bears in 2010. In the 2012–13 season, Marnegrave averaged 11.7 points per game and led the league in steals with 2.4 per game.

Marnegrave signed with defending Belgian champion Telenet BC Oostende for the 2013–14 season. He still played there in 2014-2015 and 2015-2016 season.

On 9 June 2016 Marnegrave signed with Spirou Charleroi.

Coaching career
In September 2021, Marnegrave joined his last club Limburg United as assistant coach.

Honors
Belgian League (3): 2014, 2015, 2016
Belgian Cup (4): 2006, 2014, 2015, 2016
Individual awards
Belgian League assists leader (1): 2016

References

External links
Profile at eurocupbasketball.com
Eurobasket.com profile

1987 births
Living people
Point guards
BC Oostende players
Limburg United players
Belfius Mons-Hainaut players
Belgian men's basketball players
Leuven Bears players
Liège Basket players
Spirou Charleroi players
Sportspeople from Liège
RBC Pepinster players